Samtskhe–Javakheti Hydro Power Plant will be a large power plant in Georgia two has two turbines with a nominal capacity of 35 MW each having a total capacity of 70 MW.

See also

 List of power stations in Georgia (country)
 Energy in Georgia (country)

References

Hydroelectric power stations in Georgia (country)
Proposed hydroelectric power stations
Buildings and structures in Samtskhe–Javakheti
Proposed renewable energy power stations in Georgia (country)